Jan Corneliszoon Meppel ( – 2 November 1669) was a Dutch admiral who took the place of Pieter Floriszoon after his death. He fought in the Four Days' Battle, the St. James's Day Battle, and the Raid on the Medway.

17th-century Dutch people
1610s births
1669 deaths
Admirals of the navy of the Dutch Republic
Dutch naval personnel of the Anglo-Dutch Wars
People from Hoorn
Year of birth uncertain